"Panic Attack" is a song by  British rock band The Paddingtons, released on 4 April 2005.  It is the first single to be taken from their début album First Comes First.  Overall, it is the band's second single behind "21", which was released the previous year, and which was re-recorded for First Comes First.

Released on three formats and peaking at #25 on the UK Singles Chart, the single featured three new songs, including a covers of  The Vaselines' "Molly's Lips" and  Great Big Sea's "Yarmouth Town", as well as an original B-side, "Keep Your Distance".

Details by format
CD - 9870603
"Panic Attack"
"Molly's Lips"

7" 1 - 9870602
A1. "Panic Attack"
B1. "Keep Your Distance"

7" 2 - 9870857
A1. "Panic Attack"
B1. "Yarmouth Town"

Trivia
  "Molly's Lips" co-writer Eugene Kelly (of The Vaselines), is known to be a fan of this version.
  Dirty Pretty Things' "Deadwood" 7" single features an acoustic cover of "Panic Attack".

References

2005 singles
The Paddingtons songs
2005 songs